The following contains the names of the members of the 2005 South Carolina Gamecocks men's soccer team and the results of each match. The 2005 season was the first in which the Gamecocks were members of Conference USA. Up until 2005 they had competed as an NCAA Independent because the SEC does not sponsor men's soccer.

The year turned out to be a successful one for the Gamecocks. The gamecocks would topple three top-15 opponents, finish the regular season with a conference record of 7-1-1 in their first year, and beat Tulsa for the conference tournament crown on national television. Unfortunately for the Gamecocks, their season ended in a heart-breaking 2-0 loss to the Wake Forest Demon Deacons in the first round of the NCAA Tournament.

Roster

Results 

*Conference Game

See also 
 South Carolina Gamecocks

References 

South Carolina Gamecocks men's soccer seasons
South Carolina Gamecocks
South Carolina Gamecocks
South Carolina Gamecocks, soccer men's
South Carolina